Samuel Kofi Barrington (born October 5, 1990) is a former American football linebacker. He played college football at South Florida, and was drafted by the Green Bay Packers in the seventh round of the 2013 NFL Draft. Barrington has also played for the Kansas City Chiefs, New Orleans Saints, and Buffalo Bills.

Early years
Barrington attended Terry Parker High School in Jacksonville, Florida, where he started all four years and played on both sides of the ball. He logged 1,188 yards rushing and 17 touchdowns on 108 carries as a senior, and also added more than 109 tackles, five sacks, one interception, two forced fumbles, two fumble recoveries and six pass break-ups while playing multiple linebacker positions. He recorded 104 tackles, including 74 solo stops, three sacks and three forced fumbles during his junior season.

Professional career

Green Bay Packers
Barrington was selected in the seventh round (232nd overall) by the Green Bay Packers in the 2013 NFL Draft. On May 10, 2013, he signed a contract with the Packers. Barrington was placed on injured reserve on November 5, 2013.

He suffered a foot injury against the Chicago Bears in Week 1 of the 2015 season. Barrington was placed on injured reserve two days later. He was the Packers' nominee for the Walter Payton NFL Man of the Year Award in 2015.

On September 3, 2016, Barrington was released by the Packers during final team cuts.

Kansas City Chiefs
On September 4, 2016, Barrington was claimed off waivers by the Kansas City Chiefs. He was released by the Chiefs on November 1, 2016.

New Orleans Saints
On November 9, 2016, Barrington was signed by the New Orleans Saints.

Buffalo Bills
On July 25, 2017, Barrington signed with the Buffalo Bills. He was placed on injured reserve on September 2, 2017, and then reached an injury settlement with the team the next day and was released.

Statistics
Source: NFL.com

Personal life
Barrington is a cousin of former Packers nose tackle Letroy Guion.

References

External links
Kansas City Chiefs bio
Green Bay Packers bio
South Florida Bulls bio

1990 births
Living people
Players of American football from Jacksonville, Florida
Players of American football from Orlando, Florida
Terry Parker High School alumni
American football linebackers
South Florida Bulls football players
Green Bay Packers players
Kansas City Chiefs players
New Orleans Saints players
Buffalo Bills players
Ed Block Courage Award recipients